The UNIVAC 9000 series (9200, 9300, 9400, 9700) was a line of computers introduced by Sperry Rand in the mid-1960s to compete with the low end of the IBM System/360 series.  The 9200 and 9300 (which differed only in CPU speed) implemented the same restricted 16-bit subset of the System/360 instruction set as the IBM 360/20, while the UNIVAC 9400 implemented a subset of the full 32-bit System/360 instruction set. The 9400 was roughly equivalent to the IBM 360/30.

The 9000 series used monolithic integrated circuits for logic and plated wire memory; the latter functioned somewhat like core memory but used a non-destructive read. Since the 9000 series was intended as direct competitors to IBM, they used 80-column cards and EBCDIC character encoding.

The UNIVAC 9200 was marketed as a functional replacement for the 1004 and as a direct competitor to the IBM 360/20. The printer-processor was one cabinet, the power supply and memory another and the card reader and optional card punch made an 'L' shaped configuration. Memory was 8 KB expandable to 32 KB. The 9200 II and 9300 II models, introduced in 1969, were extensions of the original 9200 and 9300 systems.

The printer differed from earlier UNIVAC printers, being similar to IBM's "bar printer" of the same era. It used an oscillating-type bar instead of the drums that had been used until this point, and ran at speeds up to 300 lines per minute.

As Sperry moved into the 1970s, they expanded the 9000 family with the introduction of the 9700 system in 1971.

See also
 UNIVAC Series 90

References

External links 
 Operational Univac 9400 in the German computer history museum technikum29

UNIVAC mainframe computers
16-bit computers
32-bit computers